The DZ Bank building (formerly DG Bank building) is an office, conference, and residential building located at  Pariser Platz 3 in Berlin.  It was designed by architect Frank Gehry and engineered by Hans Schober of Schlaich Bergermann & Partner.  Construction began in 1998 and was completed in 2000.

The building is mixed-use.  Facing the Brandenburg Gate are offices, the headquarters of Deutsche Zentral-Genossenschaftsbank.  On the other side, facing Behrenstraße, are 39 residential apartments.  Between the two is a large atrium, designed to be used as a conference or performance space.  This is covered with a sophisticated glass-grid roof, curved in a complex form typical of Gehry's designs.

See also
 Thin-shell structure
 History of Berlin

External links

Architectural Record page on DG Bank building

Commercial buildings completed in 2000
Residential buildings completed in 2000
Frank Gehry buildings
Buildings and structures in Berlin
Bank buildings in Germany
2000 establishments in Germany